The 1935–36 Sheffield Shield season was the 40th season of the Sheffield Shield, the domestic first-class cricket competition of Australia. South Australia won the championship.

Table

Statistics

Most Runs
Don Bradman 739

Most Wickets
Frank Ward 33

References

Sheffield Shield
Sheffield Shield
Sheffield Shield seasons